"Bruises" is a song by Scottish singer-songwriter Lewis Capaldi. It was initially self-released independently on 31 March 2017, later being re-released as a digital download on 16 May 2017, after Capaldi signed to Virgin Records, as the lead single from his debut extended play Bloom and his debut studio album Divinely Uninspired to a Hellish Extent.  It was released once again on 7 January 2020 as Capaldi's third single.

Background

It was the first song he had written with a piano. It was originally called “Something in the Water Pt. II".

Track listing

Charts

Weekly charts

Year-end charts

Certifications

Release history

Usage in media
The song has been featured in the second season of Riverdale and the third season of Magnum P.I.

References

2017 songs
2017 debut singles
Lewis Capaldi songs
Songs written by Lewis Capaldi
Virgin Records singles